Madonna and Child with Two Saints and a Donor is a c. 1395–1400 tempera and gold leaf on panel painting by Gentile da Fabriano, the earliest surviving major work by the artist. Probably painted for the church of Santa Caterina in Castelvecchio in Fabriano (the painter's father lived near that church from 1385 onwards after being widowed), near to which it is now in the Gemäldegalerie in Berlin.

On the right is Catherine of Alexandria, referring to the name of the church for which the work was probably produced. To the left is Nicholas of Bari presenting the work's donor - the latter dressed as a merchant and may be Ambrogio di Bonaventura (died between 1395 and 1408), whose golden mark (a circle with rays surmounted by a cross) is to be seen at his feet.

References

1390s paintings
Paintings of Catherine of Alexandria
Paintings of Saint Nicholas
Paintings in the Gemäldegalerie, Berlin
Paintings of the Madonna and Child by Gentile da Fabriano